The 2010 Labour Party leadership election was triggered on 10 May 2010 by incumbent leader Gordon Brown's resignation following the 2010 general election which resulted in a hung parliament; the first since 1974. Brown resigned as Leader of the Labour Party on 10 May and as Prime Minister on 11 May, following the Conservatives and Liberal Democrats forming a coalition government.
The National Executive Committee decided the timetable for the election the result of which would be announced at the annual party conference. On 25 September 2010, Ed Miliband became the new Leader of the Labour Party, narrowly defeating his older brother, David.

Procedure
The rules of the Labour Party stated in 2010 that "each nomination [for leader] must be supported by 12.5 per cent of the Commons members of the Parliamentary Labour Party." As the number of Labour MPs was 257 (the 258 returned at the general election minus Eric Illsley, who had been suspended from the Parliamentary Labour Party) 33 MPs needed to support any nomination. Nominations opened on 24 May and closed on 27 May, but the deadline was extended to 9 June after complaints from John McDonnell, Diane Abbott, and Ed Miliband that the short deadline had provided insufficient time to secure the 33 nominations from MPs needed for inclusion on the ballot. The ballot took place between 1 and 22 September, and the results were announced on the first day of the party's conference in Manchester, 25 September. There were three distinct electorates, the electors of which cast their votes on a "one member, one vote" basis in each applicable category:
 Labour members of the House of Commons and the European Parliament
 Individual members of the party
 Individual members of affiliated organisations, such as trade unions and socialist societies
Each of the three electorates or sections contributed one third (33.33 per cent) of the total votes and were counted using the Alternative Vote system system. The election was run by the National Executive Committee, and the results were announced at the annual conference in September 2010.

Union recommendation controversy

Under Labour Party rules, trade unions were allowed to make recommendations to their members, but were barred from doing this in the same envelope that contained the ballot paper. During the election, it emerged that both the GMB and Unite had included both an envelope containing the ballot paper, and an envelope containing promotional material for Ed Miliband, their favoured candidate, in the same communication. Though the promotional material was in a different envelope from the ballot paper, this nevertheless attracted criticism that they had breached the spirit of the rules.

Candidates
At a meeting of the Cabinet held on 10 May 2010, it was agreed that no one would announce their candidacy until after formal negotiations in regards to forming a government were resolved. The Conservative Party and Liberal Democrats formed a coalition on 11 May, and David Miliband became the first person to announce his candidacy the following day. A total of six candidates emerged by 20 May:

 Diane Abbott, announced 20 May
 Ed Balls, announced 19 May
 Andy Burnham, announced 20 May
 John McDonnell, announced 18 May; withdrew 9 June
 David Miliband, announced 12 May
 Ed Miliband, announced 14 May

On 9 June John McDonnell withdrew from the contest in favour of Diane Abbott, who eventually made the ballot paper.

Nominations

Candidates must receive nominations from at least 12.5 per cent of the 257 Parliamentary Labour Party members (33) to appear on the ballot. John McDonnell had 16 nominations when he withdrew on 9 June, in favour of Diane Abbott. The final nominations figures were as follows:

The number of MPs next to the candidate's name below includes the actual candidate too, as they counted as one of the 33 MPs needed (except for David Miliband, as he nominated Diane Abbott to ensure her appearance on the ballot). Public nominations for candidates by MPs were as follows:

David Miliband (81): Bob Ainsworth, Douglas Alexander, Willie Bain, Gordon Banks, Hugh Bayley, Stuart Bell, Ben Bradshaw, Russell Brown, Richard Burden, Liam Byrne, David Cairns, Alan Campbell, Jenny Chapman, Ann Clwyd, Ann Coffey, Rosie Cooper, Mary Creagh, Stella Creasy, Alex Cunningham, Simon Danczuk, Alistair Darling, Gloria De Piero, Brian Donohoe, Gemma Doyle, Angela Eagle, Julie Elliott, Louise Ellman, Chris Evans, Jim Fitzpatrick, Caroline Flint, Paul Flynn, Mike Gapes, Barry Gardiner, Pat Glass, Mary Glindon, Fabian Hamilton, David Hanson, Tom Harris, Mark Hendrick, Margaret Hodge, George Howarth, Tristram Hunt, Alan Johnson, Tessa Jowell, Gerald Kaufman, Liz Kendall, Ivan Lewis, Michael McCann, Gregg McClymont, Siobhain McDonagh, Pat McFadden, Anne McGuire, Ian Mearns, Alun Michael, Jessica Morden, Meg Munn, Jim Murphy, Ian Murray, Pamela Nash, Fiona O'Donnell, Toby Perkins, Bridget Phillipson, Yasmin Qureshi, Nick Raynsford, Jamie Reed, Jonathan Reynolds, Frank Roy, Chris Ruane, Anas Sarwar, Virendra Sharma, Barry Sheerman, Angela Smith, Nick Smith, Peter Soulsby, Graham Stringer, Mark Tami, Gareth Thomas, Valerie Vaz, Phil Wilson, John Woodcock, Shaun Woodward
Ed Miliband (63): Adrian Bailey, Margaret Beckett, Anne Begg, Hilary Benn, Luciana Berger, Roberta Blackman-Woods, Paul Blomfield, Karen Buck, Margaret Curran, Wayne David, Geraint Davies, John Denham, Frank Dobson, Jack Dromey, Maria Eagle, Clive Efford, Natascha Engel, Bill Esterson, Frank Field, Hywel Francis, Helen Goodman, Tom Greatrex, Lilian Greenwood, Peter Hain, David Hamilton, Jimmy Hood, Graham Jones, Susan Jones, Sadiq Khan, Ian Lavery, Mark Lazarowicz, Andy Love, Ian Lucas, Shabana Mahmood, John Mann, Gordon Marsden, Jim McGovern, Ann McKechin, Catherine McKinnell, Michael Meacher, Alan Meale, Madeleine Moon, Grahame Morris, Paul Murphy, Lisa Nandy, Sandra Osborne, Albert Owen, Stephen Pound, Rachel Reeves, Emma Reynolds, Lindsay Roy, Joan Ruddock, Alison Seabeck, Jim Sheridan, Andy Slaughter, Owen Smith, Emily Thornberry, Stephen Timms, Chuka Umunna, Alan Whitehead, Christopher Williamson, Rosie Winterton
Ed Balls (33): David Anderson, Ian Austin, Tom Blenkinsop, Kevin Brennan, Lyn Brown, Vernon Coaker, Yvette Cooper, David Crausby, Jim Cunningham, Jim Dobbin, Mike Dugher, Andrew Gwynne, John Healey, Stephen Hepburn, Sharon Hodgson, Diana Johnson, Helen Jones, Eric Joyce, Barbara Keeley, Chris Leslie, Khalid Mahmood, Steve McCabe, Kerry McCarthy, Teresa Pearce, John Robertson, Geoffrey Robinson, Marsha Singh, Andrew Smith, John Spellar, Tom Watson, David Wright, Iain Wright
Andy Burnham (33): Heidi Alexander, Kevin Barron, Joe Benton, Clive Betts, Hazel Blears, David Blunkett, Tom Clarke, Michael Connarty, Nic Dakin, Thomas Docherty, Frank Doran, Paul Farrelly, Rob Flello, Yvonne Fovargue, Paul Goggins, Kate Green, Julie Hilling, Lindsay Hoyle, Huw Irranca-Davies, Cathy Jamieson, Kevan Jones, Alan Keen, Alison McGovern, Andrew Miller, Austin Mitchell, Steve Rotheram, Gerry Sutcliffe, Karl Turner, Derek Twigg, Joan Walley, Dave Watts, Malcolm Wicks
Diane Abbott (33): Rushanara Ali, Chris Bryant, Ronnie Campbell, Katy Clark, Jeremy Corbyn, Jon Cruddas, John Cryer, Ian Davidson, Sheila Gilmore, Nia Griffith, Harriet Harman, Meg Hillier, Kate Hoey, Kelvin Hopkins, Sian James, David Lammy, Tony Lloyd, Denis MacShane, Fiona MacTaggart, John McDonnell, David Miliband, George Mudie, Chi Onwurah, Linda Riordan, Gavin Shuker, Dennis Skinner, Jack Straw, Jon Trickett, Stephen Twigg, Keith Vaz, Mike Wood, Phil Woolas

Before dropping out of the race on 9 June 2010, John McDonnell had the following 16 nominations: Ronnie Campbell, Martin Caton, Katy Clark, Jeremy Corbyn, John Cryer, Ian Davidson, Jim Dowd, Frank Field, Dai Havard, Kate Hoey, Ian Lavery, Graeme Morrice, Linda Riordan, Dennis Skinner, Mike Wood

Notable Labour politicians who declined to stand
Some members of parliament were seen as potential candidates but decided against running:
Hazel Blears – former Communities and Local Government Secretary; supported Andy Burnham
Yvette Cooper – former Work and Pensions Secretary; supported her husband Ed Balls
Jon Cruddas – backbencher who stood for Deputy Leader in 2007; he nominated Diane Abbott and supported David Miliband 
Alistair Darling – former Chancellor of the Exchequer; supported David Miliband
Peter Hain – former Wales Secretary, previously Northern Ireland and Work and Pensions Secretary; supported Ed Miliband
Harriet Harman – acting leader following Gordon Brown's departure, former Leader of the House of Commons; neutral but nominated Diane Abbott
Alan Johnson – former Home Secretary, previously Health Secretary and Education Secretary; supported David Miliband
Jack Straw – former Justice Secretary and Lord Chancellor, previously Foreign and Home Secretary; nominated Diane Abbott and supported David Miliband

Televised debates

Opinion polling

Results
Each of the three electorates or sections contributed one third (33.33 per cent) of the total votes and were counted using the Alternative Vote system system.

Overall result

The total of first-round votes for Balls, Burnham, and Abbott (27.89%) was less than Ed Miliband's vote (34.33%). Thus, it was certain after the first round that Balls, Burnham, and Abbott would all be eliminated.

Turnout in the members section was 71.7%, with 127,330 votes cast of the 177,558 ballots distributed. Amongst affiliated members, turnout was 9.0%, whilst amongst MPs/MEPs turnout was 98.5%.

Labour MPs and MEPs

Constituency Labour Parties

The map below shows the results of the Constituency Labour Parties first round preferences in the leadership election by constituency, before votes were transferred due to eliminations. David Miliband took the most constituencies, winning 577 in total. He was followed by Ed Miliband who took sixty-seven constituencies. Andy Burnham won eight seats, all in north-west England, Ed Balls took two constituencies (his own, Morley & Outwood, and that of his wife, Yvette Cooper, Normanton, Pontefract and Castleford), and Diane Abbott won no constituencies. All ties with the exception of Wigan (Burnham and David Miliband) were between David and Ed Miliband. Northern Ireland was counted as one constituency.

Trade Unions and Socialist Societies

Turnout in the affiliates section was 9.0%, with 247,339 votes cast of the 2,747,030 ballots distributed.

See also
2007 Labour Party leadership election (UK)
2007 Labour Party deputy leadership election
Labour Party Rule Book

Notes

References

External links

News
Factbox – Rules governing Labour leadership elections Reuters, 10 May 2010
Labour party leadership The Guardian

Party websites
Labour Party
Labour Party Rule Book 2008 (PDF)

Candidates' leadership campaign websites
Diane Abbott: Diane 4 Leader – Turn the page, change the party
Andy Burnham – Re-connecting Labour
Ed Balls for Labour Leader
David Miliband – Bringing Labour together leading Labour to power 
Ed Miliband for Labour Leader

2010 elections in the United Kingdom
2010
Ed Miliband
Andy Burnham
Ed Balls
Labour Party leadership election (UK)